Dan-Neil Javan Telesford (born 9 September 1990) is a sprinter from Trinidad and Tobago. He won a bronze medal in the 4 × 100 metres relay at the 2015 Pan American Games.

International competitions

1Disqualified in the semifinals

Personal bests

Outdoor
100 metres – 10.28 (+1.8 m/s, Port-of-Spain 2017)
200 metres – 20.50 (-1.0 m/s, Port-of-Spain 2017)
400 metres – 47.23 (Marabella 2011)
Indoor
200 metres – 21.96 (Fayetteville 2013)
400 metres – 49.31 (Cedar Falls 2013)

References

1990 births
Living people
Trinidad and Tobago male sprinters
Athletes (track and field) at the 2015 Pan American Games
Pan American Games medalists in athletics (track and field)
Pan American Games bronze medalists for Trinidad and Tobago
Competitors at the 2017 Summer Universiade
Medalists at the 2015 Pan American Games